Scirpophaga parvalis is a moth in the family Crambidae. It was described by Alfred Ernest Wileman in 1911. It is found in China (Heilongjiang, Beijing, Hebei, Shandong, Henan, Shaanxi, Gansu Jiangsu, Anhui, Hubei, Fujian), Japan and Korea.

The wingspan is 20–25 mm for males and 25–31 mm for females.

References

Moths described in 1911
Schoenobiinae
Moths of Asia
Moths of Japan
Moths of Korea